Marion Mckinley Bradford (October 28, 1946 - May 3, 2021) was an American scientist who developed and patented the Bradford protein assay, a method to quickly quantify the amount of protein in a sample. His paper describing the method is among the most cited scholarly articles of all time.

Biography

Early life and education
Bradford was born October 28, 1946, in Rome, Georgia, USA, and received his B.A. from Shorter College there in 1967.  In 1971 he married Janet Holliday.  He obtained his Ph.D. in Biochemistry from the University of Georgia in 1975, and his use of the Coomassie Brilliant Blue G-250 dye to detect proteins, which became known as the Bradford assay, was patented in 1976.

Career
Bradford was employed by the University of Georgia as a research biochemist from 1977 to 1983. In the latter year he joined A. E. Staley and worked in biochemical research there until his retirement.

Bradford died on May 3, 2021, in Hendersonville, North Carolina.

Award
2019 - University of Georgia Distinction Award

References

1946 births
2021 deaths
American biochemists
Shorter University alumni
University of Georgia alumni
People from Rome, Georgia

Further reading
 Bradford's et al. publication list